The 31st Rescue Squadron is part of the 18th Wing at Kadena Air Base, Japan. It trains, equips and employs combat-ready pararescue specialists.

History
The 31st Rescue Squadron was constituted as the 31st Air Rescue Squadron on 17 October 1952. They made combat rescues in Southeast Asia, 1965–1966 and also operated the Joint Rescue Coordination Center for Thirteenth Air Force, Apr 1967 – July 1975. They took part in disaster relief missions in the Philippines between 16–31 July 1990.  As a USAF Special Operations Squadron the 31st was forward deployed at Osan Air Base, Korea from 1992–2001, while its headquarters at the 353d Special Operations Group was stationed at Kadena Air Base, Okinawa, Japan.  Inactivated for a couple of years, in 2003 the squadron was redesignated the 31st Rescue Squadron under the 18th Wing and stationed at Kadena Air Base, Okinawa, Japan.

Lineage
 Constituted as the 31st Air Rescue Squadron on 17 October 1952
 Activated on 14 November 1952
 Discontinued on 18 September 1960
 Organized on 8 July 1963
 Redesignated 31st Aerospace Rescue and Recovery Squadron on 8 January 1966
 Inactivated on 1 July 1975
 Activated on 8 January 1981
 Redesignated 31st Special Operations Squadron on 6 April 1989
 Inactivated on 31 August 2001
 Redesignated 31st Rescue Squadron on 16 May 2003
 Activated on 31 July 2003

Assignments
 2d Air Rescue Group, 14 November 1952
 Air Rescue Service, 24 June 1958 – 18 September 1960
 Air Rescue Service (later Aerospace Rescue and Recovery Service), 8 July 1963 (attached to Pacific Air Rescue Center (later Pacific Aerospace Rescue and Recovery) Center, until 31 March 1967)
 Pacific Aerospace Rescue and Recovery Center (later 41st Aerospace Rescue and Recovery Wing), 1 April 1967 – 1 July 1975
 41st Rescue and Weather Reconnaissance Wing, 8 January 1981
 353d Special Operations Wing (later 353d Special Operations Group) 6 April 1989 – 31 August 2001
 18th Operations Group, 31 July 2003 – present

Stations
 Clark Air Base, Philippines, 14 November 1952
 Naha Air Base, Okinawa, 12–18 September 1960
 Clark Air Base, Philippines, 8 July 1963 – 1 July 1975
 Clark Air Base, Philippines, 8 January 1981
 Ching Chuan Kang Air Base, Taiwan, 10 May 1965 – 31 May 1975
 Marine Corps Air Station Futenma, Okinawa, Japan, 29 June 1991
 Osan Air Base, South Korea, July 1992 – 31 August 2001
 Kadena Air Base, Okinawa, Japan, 31 July 2003 – present

Aircraft
 Grumman SA-16 Albatross, 1952–1960
 Sikorsky H-19 Chickasaw, 1952–1955
 Sikorsky SH-19 (later HH-19), 1955–1960, 1963–1964
 Douglas HC-54, 1964–1965
 Kaman HH-43 Huskie, 1964–1970, 1971–1972
 Boeing HC-97, 1965–1966
 Lockheed HC-130 Hercules, 1966–1975
 Sikorsky HH-3, 1968–1975, 1981–1990
 Sikorsky CH-3, 1981–1990
 Sikorsky MH-53, 1990–2001
 Boeing MH-47 Chinook, 2001

See also
 List of United States Air Force rescue squadrons

References

External links
 31st Special Operations Squadron History
 The PAVE Cave (unofficial PAVE LOW website)

031